Chirodini Ami Je Tomar  is an Indian Bengali television soap opera that premiered on 29 July 2019 and is broadcast on Colors Bangla and is also available on the digital platform Voot. The show starred model-actress Sharly Modak and Souvik Banerjee in lead roles and Suvajit Kar in a negative role.

Cast

Main
Sharly Modak as Anuradha Sanyal
Souvik Banerjee as Ranodeep Basak
Suvajit Kar as Abir (Main Antagonist)

Supporting
Anindita Raychaudhury as Bidisha
Dwaipayan Das/Vivaan Ghosh as Late Ali
Surojit Banerjee as Rathindra Basak
Tulika Basu as Mrinilani Basak
Sanjib Sarkar as Rathikanta Sanyal
Ranjini Chattopadhaya as Suroma Sanyal
Sumana Chakraborty as Mrittika
Nayna Banerjee as Keka

References

External links
 Production website

Indian television soap operas
Colors Bangla original programming